Cyanea is a genus of jellyfish, primarily found in northern waters of the Atlantic and Pacific Oceans and southern Pacific waters of Australia and New Zealand, there are also several boreal, polar, tropical and sub-tropical species. Commonly found in and associated with rivers and fjords. The same genus name has been given to a genus of plants of the Hawaiian lobelioids, an example of a parahomonym (same name, different kingdom).

Species 
The taxonomy of Cyanea species has seen increased scrutiny in recent years. Early zoologists suggested that all species within the genus should be treated as one. Recent molecular and integrative taxonomic studies have refuted this assertion as the scyphozoan community has restored many of the previous species. For example, in the North Sea, the lion's mane jellyfish and the blue jellyfish appear as distinct species. On the East Coast of the United States there are at least two co-occurring species, C. fulva and C. versicolor. Cyanea may be a species complex of recently diverged species.

Cyanea annasethe Haeckel, 1880
Cyanea annaskala von Lendenfeld, 1882
Cyanea barkeri Gershwin, Zeidler & Davie, 2010 [nomen dubium]
Cyanea buitendijki Stiasny, 1919
Cyanea capillata Linnaeus, 1758
Cyanea citrea Kishinouye, 1910
Cyanea ferruginea Eschscholtz, 1829
Cyanea fulva Agassiz, 1862
Cyanea lamarckii Péron & Lesueur, 1810
Cyanea mjöbergi Stiasny, 1921
Cyanea muellerianthe Haacke, 1887
Cyanea nozakii Kishinouye, 1891
Cyanea postelsi Brandt, 1835
Cyanea purpurea Kishinouye, 1910
Cyanea rosea Quoy & Gaimard, 1824
Cyanea tzetlinii Kolbasova & Neretina, 2015
Cyanea versicolor Agassiz, 1862

References

Bibliography 

 
 
 
 
 
 
 
 
 
 
 
 
 
 

Cyaneidae
Scyphozoan genera